Jugo de tamarindo is a 2019 Peruvian comedy film written, directed, produced and co-starred by Julio Andrade in his directorial debut. Starring Karen Dejo, Leslie Stewart and Gerardo Zamora. It is based on the homonymous video clip by Julio Andrade.

Synopsis 
Jugo de tamarindo focuses on a musician with domestic and marital problems. Until, in the middle of the tour, he meets a dancer with a traumatic past and with whom he made a successful video clip some time ago.

Cast 
The actors participating in this film are:

 Julio Andrade
 Karen Dejo
 Leslie Stewart
 Gerardo Zamora
 Carolina Alvarez
 Américo Zúñiga
 Nicolás Fantinato
 Gustavo Cerrón
 Carlos Barraza
 Kukuli Morante
 Patsy Bendayán

Production 
On September 9, 2015, the making of a film based on his video clip Jugo de tamarindo was announced, later the principal photography began in May 2016.

Release 
Jugo de tamarindo was scheduled to be released on January 10, 2019, in Peruvian theaters, but ended up being released on January 24 of the same year.

Reception 
In its opening weekend it attracted 1,200 moviegoers, being surpassed by the re-release of Schindler's List.

References

External links 

 

2019 films
2019 comedy films
Peruvian comedy films
Star Films films
2010s Spanish-language films
2010s Peruvian films
Films set in Peru
Films shot in Peru
Films about music and musicians
Films based on songs
2019 directorial debut films